Labor Age was a monthly political magazine published from 1922 to 1933. The publisher was by the Labor Publication Society.

History

Establishment
Labor Age succeeded the Socialist Review, journal of the Intercollegiate Socialist Society. It advocated industrial unionism, economic planning, and workers' education (especially the activities of Brookwood Labor College). It reported extensively on innovative tactics for organizing nonunion workers in mass production industries, identifying tactics that would become standard procedure for union organizers in the 1930s and 1940s. 

The Socialist Review and Labor Age were the official publications of the League for Industrial Democracy from 1921–1929. In May 1929, the editors of Labor Age helped to form the Conference for Progressive Labor Action (CPLA) in order to counter what they considered growing pro-business tendencies in the American Federation of Labor.

Demise

In 1932, the CPLA voted to supplement the monthly Labor Age with a daily newspaper, called Labor Action, but that was never realized. Labor Age ceased publication after the February-March 1933 issue.

Contributors

Important figures associated with Labor Age were A. J. Muste, James Maurer, Harry W. Laidler, Fannia Cohn, and Louis Budenz.   Other contributors of the December 1931 issue included:  Judson King, Bruce Crawford, Benjamin Mandel, Sam Bakely, J.B. Matthews, Ludwig Lore, David J. Saposs, and P atrick L. Quinlan.

See also
 Conference for Progressive Labor Action
 A.J. Muste

References

Sources
 Jon Bloom and Paul Buhle, "Intercollegiate Socialist Society and Successors," in Encyclopedia of the American Left. Urbana: University of Illinois Press, 1990; pp. 362–363.
Labor Age via the Marxists Internet Archive (full, complete and high resolution): https://www.marxists.org/history/usa/pubs/laborage/index.htm
Labor Age via HathiTrust Digital Library: https://catalog.hathitrust.org/Record/000058992

Monthly magazines published in the United States
Defunct political magazines published in the United States
1922 establishments in the United States
Magazines established in 1929
Magazines disestablished in 1933
Socialist magazines
1933 disestablishments in the United States